(3-methyl-2-oxobutanoate dehydrogenase (2-methylpropanoyl-transferring))-phosphatase (EC 3.1.3.52, branched-chain oxo-acid dehydrogenase phosphatase, branched-chain 2-keto acid dehydrogenase phosphatase, branched-chain α-keto acid dehydrogenase phosphatase, BCKDH', [3-methyl-2-oxobutanoate dehydrogenase (lipoamide)]-phosphatase, [3-methyl-2-oxobutanoate dehydrogenase (lipoamide)]-phosphate phosphohydrolase) is an enzyme with systematic name (3-methyl-2-oxobutanoate dehydrogenase (2-methylpropanoyl-transferring))-phosphate phosphohydrolase. This enzyme catalyses the following chemical reaction

 [3-methyl-2-oxobutanoate dehydrogenase (2-methylpropanoyl-transferring)] phosphate + H2O  [3-methyl-2-oxobutanoate dehydrogenase (2-methylpropanoyl-transferring)] + phosphate

This mitochondrial enzyme is associated with the 3-methyl-2-oxobutanoate dehydrogenase complex.

References

External links 
 

EC 3.1.3